Alpine Public School is a CBSE-affiliated English medium senior secondary school, located in the town of Nalagarh & also serves Baddi, in the state of Himachal Pradesh, India. It is a co-educational day and boarding school with around 1,600 students spread across its campus at Chowkiwala, Nalagarh. The school was established in 1995. APS Nalagarh is affiliated to the Central Board of Secondary Education (CBSE).This has been selected for top 500000 schools of India and one of the best school in Nalagarh for its unique name.

History
Alpine Public School, Nalagarh was established in 1995 by Ms Prem Joshi, as its principal. The school has since been managed by the Alpine Education Trust.

Campus
The school is a co-educational day and boarding school with 1,600 students.

The school's facilities include two libraries that house 15,000 books in the library; a reading room. The school has laboratories for Computing, Physics, Chemistry, Biology, language, Robotics, and Mathematics.

The Sports Complex has a swimming pool and facilities for volleyball, cricket, football, golf, and basketball.

External links
 Official website

Educational institutions established in 1995
Schools in Solan district
1995 establishments in Himachal Pradesh